Taihuai is a town in Wutai County, Xinzhou, Shanxi, China.   it had a population of 10,525 and an area of . The Han, Manchu, Mongolian and Tibetan live here. Taihuai located in the northeastern Wutai County. It borders the Yedou Peak in the north, Guayue Peak and Fanshi County in the west, Mount Taihang and Shizui Township in the east, and Jingangku Township and Lingjing Township in the south.

History
In the Xu Xiake's Travels, Xu Xiake (1587-1641) described the town as "Under the north Mount Wutai, Taiwan (Taihuai) is located in the west of eastern Mount Wutai, in the north of southern Mount Wutai.".

Administrative division
As of 2016, it include 22 villages: Dongtaigou Village, Guangmingsi Village, Dongzhuang Village, Yangpodao Village, Yanglin Village, Taihuai Village, Xinfang Village, Yangboyu Village, Chegou Village, Zhulinsi Village, Qingliangshe Village, Loushang Village, Miaogou Village, Rizhaosi Village, Da'nanzhuang Village, Kuantan Village, Huangtuzui Village, Baitou'an Village, Huyingou Village, Nanta Village(), Shifo Village, and Luobaogou Village.

Geography
Mount Dailuoding, also known as "Green Mount Peak", located in the east of the town. Mount Fanxian, located in the south of the town.

There are more than 595 plant species cultivated in the town. There are some 142 species of bird and 208 species of mammals to be seen in the town.

Climate

Attractions
There are more than thirty Buddhist temples in the town, including Jinge Temple, Mimi Temple, Xiantong Temple, Tayuan Temple, Wanfo Pavilion, Luohou Temple, Yuanzhao Temple, Guangzong Temple, Pusading, Cifu Temple, Shuxiang Temple, Longquan Temple, Zhenhai Temple, Nanshan Temple, Bishan Temple, Lingfeng Temple, Shouning Temple, Guangren Temple, Puhua Temple, Santa Temple, Qifu Temple, Guanghua Temple, Fanxian Temple, Jifu Temple, Pushou Temple, Jixiang Temple, Wuye Temple, and Mingyue Chi.

References

Bibliography
 

Divisions of Wutai County
Xinzhou